Raymond James "Ray" "Iron Eich" Eichenlaub (July 15, 1892 – November 9, 1949) was an American college football player who was a fullback for the Notre Dame Fighting Irish football team of the University of Notre Dame.  He received All-American honors for three consecutive seasons from 1912 to 1914. He played for the Columbus Tigers of the NFL in 1925. Eichenlaub was inducted into the College Football Hall of Fame in 1972.

References

1892 births
1949 deaths
American football fullbacks
Notre Dame Fighting Irish football players
College Football Hall of Fame inductees
Players of American football from Columbus, Ohio
Columbus Tigers players